Mission Blue is a 2014 documentary film following Dr. Sylvia Earle on her quest trying to protect the ocean from threats as pollution, overfishing and climate change.  It won the 2015 News & Documentary Emmy Award for Outstanding Editing – Documentary and Long Form.

Cast 
 Barbara Block
 James Cameron
 Mike deGruy
 Sylvia Earle
 Bryce Groark
 Graham Hankes
 Jeremy Jackson
 Carl Safina
 Fisher Stevens
 Liz Taylor
 Imogen Zethoven

References

External links
 
 
 

2014 films
2014 documentary films
Netflix original documentary films
2010s English-language films
English-language documentary films